The 2017 Liga 3 Aceh is the third edition of Liga 3 Aceh as a qualifying round for the national round of 2017 Liga 3. PSLS Lhokseumawe are the defending champions.

The competition scheduled starts on 22 July 2017.

Teams
There are 25 clubs which will participate the league in this season.

References 

2017 in Indonesian football
Sport in Aceh